Hekurudha Shqiptare or HSH (Albanian Railways) was the state-owned operator of the Albanian railway system and became a private company in 2005. The system's main passenger terminal was Durrës railway station in the port city of Durrës.

HSH's infrastructure used to run east to Pogradec (up to Librazhd ), south to Vlorë and north to Shkodër. There was also a branch line to the capital Tirana (up to Kashar, 10 km away ). The network was extended beyond Shkodër in the 1980s into what is now Montenegro, via the Albanian border town of Hani i Hotit. But this section of the system is for freight only. There is also no physical rail connection between Albania and neighbouring North Macedonia or Greece.

The HSH network was entirely unelectrified, and trains were hauled by Czechoslovak T-669 diesel-electric locomotives. The system was basically single-track throughout, with passing loops at various points. Second-hand passenger rolling stock from Germany's DB and former DR, Italy's FS, Austria's ÖBB, and Poland's PKP was used. Trains suffered internal and external damage from vandalism, including the stoning of locomotives and carriages. Further problems arose from landslide damage to sections of the track or because lengths of rail were stolen for iron scrap. As of 2022 the system is barely surviving with an Elbasan Durrës train and a Shkoder Lac train that lasts until June 13, although there are some plans to rehabilitate parts of the network in the future.

New Tirana-Rinas-Durres Railway Line 
Construction work to upgrade the Durrës–Tiranë line and linking it with Rinas Airport with Electric -powered trains started in 2021 with a loan from EBRD.

Passenger services

In 2015, some rail stations and rolling stock along the Durres-Tirane line were renovated and adopted a red and white livery. The scenic Librazhd-Pogradec line was closed for passenger traffic in 2012. The stored locomotives and carriages from Prrenjas are being moved to Elbasan. As a result, this section may be dismantled, as it doesn't link any major cities.

There are several freight-only branch lines. Occasional freight trains may run between Podgorica and Shkodër and between Durrës and the oil refinery at Ballsh. The Tirana-Shkodër line is closed, except for the Durrës Elbasan train and a section between Shkodër and Lac.

System Map

Rolling stock

Locomotives

Carriages

See also

 History of rail transport in Albania
 Rail transport in Albania
 Transport in Albania

References and notes

External links
 Official website of HSH
 Official HSH Trains Timetable, 2015
 HSH System Map and Timetable as of 2011
Albrail Official Site (operator of Fier-Vlorë railway line)
 Site dedicated to HSH (in Albanian)
 A 2019 documentary by Deutsche Welle about the Albanian railway - Albania's last trains on YouTube

Railway companies of Albania